UIO may refer to:

 University of Oslo
 Mariscal Sucre International Airport, in Quito, Ecuador
 Old Mariscal Sucre International Airport, which was replaced by the above